Gymnothamnion is a red alga genus in the family Wrangeliaceae.

Species 
 Gymnothamnion bipinnatum F.S.Collins & Hervey
 Gymnothamnion elegans (Schousboe ex C.Agardh) J.Agardh - type
 Gymnothamnion elegans var. bisporum Stegenga
 Gymnothamnion nigrescens (J.Agardh) Athanasiadis
 Gymnothamnion pteroton (Schousboe ex Bornet) Athanasiadis

References

External links 

 Gymnothamnion at algaebase.org

Red algae genera
Ceramiales